James Callaghan became Leader of the Opposition on 4 May 1979 after losing the 1979 election and remained in that office until Michael Foot was elected Leader of the Labour Party on 2 October 1980. Callaghan named his Shadow Cabinet in June 1979, with Foot (the Deputy Leader) and the 12 elected members of the Shadow Cabinet assigned portfolios on 14 June and further appointments made on 18 June. From the opening of Parliament until that date, Callaghan's Cabinet, with a few exceptions, stayed on to shadow their former positions.

Shadow Cabinet list
Callaghan assigned portfolios in June 1979 to the Deputy Leader and the 12 winners in the 1979 Shadow Cabinet elections.

Notes

References

Official Opposition (United Kingdom)
Callaghan
1980 in British politics
1979 establishments in the United Kingdom
1980 disestablishments in the United Kingdom
James Callaghan
British shadow cabinets
1979 in British politics